The Virginia House of Delegates election of 1991 was held on Tuesday, November 5. Just over a month earlier, on September 28, House Speaker A. L. Philpott died of cancer. Democratic floor leader Tom Moss led his party going into the election; Moss was elected Speaker two weeks later, after his conference maintained a majority in the chamber.

Results

Overview 

Source

Detailed Results

See also 
 1991 United States elections
 1991 Virginia elections
 1991 Virginia Senate election

References 

House of Delegates
Virginia
Virginia House of Delegates elections